Euthlastus is an extinct genus of Late Jurassic (Kimmeridgian - Tithonian) mammal from the Morrison Formation.
Present in stratigraphic zones 5 and 6. It is represented by only five upper molars.

See also 

 Prehistoric mammal
 List of prehistoric mammals
 Paleobiota of the Morrison Formation

References 

 Foster, J. (2007). Jurassic West: The Dinosaurs of the Morrison Formation and Their World. Indiana University Press. 389pp.

Dryolestida
Morrison mammals
Fossil taxa described in 1929
Prehistoric mammal genera